Abraham Verghese (born 1955) is an American physician, author, Professor for the Theory and Practice of Medicine at Stanford University Medical School and Senior Associate Chair of the Department of Internal Medicine. He is also the author of three best-selling books: two memoirs and one novel. In 2011, he was elected to be a member of the Institute of Medicine. He received the National Humanities Medal from President Barack Obama in 2015.

He was born in Ethiopia to Christian parents from Kerala, India, who worked as teachers. In 2009, Knopf published his first novel, Cutting for Stone. In 2010, Random House published the paperback version of the book and  it rose on the bestseller charts, achieving a rank of #2 on The New York Times trade paperback fiction list on March 13, 2011. It remained on The New York Times list for well over two years. Over a decade later, his new novel The Covenant of Water is set to be published in May 2023 by Grove Atlantic. In 2014, Verghese received the 19th Annual Heinz Award in the Arts and Humanities.

Medical training and early career

Verghese began his medical training in Ethiopia, but his education was interrupted during the civil unrest there when the Emperor was deposed and a Marxist military government took over. He came to America with his parents and two brothers (his elder brother George Verghese is an engineering professor at MIT and his younger brother Phil Verghese is a Staff Software Engineer at Google). Verghese worked as an orderly for a year before going to India where he completed his medical studies at Madras Medical College in Madras, now Chennai.  In his written work, he refers to his time working as an orderly in a hospital in America as deeply influential in confirming his desire to finish his medical training; the experience had given him a deep understanding of the patient's hospital situation with its varying levels of treatment and care. He has said the insights he gained from this work helped him become a more empathic physician and resulted in the motto, "Imagining the Patient's Experience", that defined his later work at the Center for Medical Humanities & Ethics in San Antonio, Texas, which he directed for five years from 2002 to 2007.

After finishing his medical degree (MBBS) from Madras University in 1979, and then completing his internship there, he came to the United States as one of hundreds of foreign medical graduates (FMGs) from India seeking open residency positions. As he described it in a New Yorker article, "The Cowpath to America", many FMGs often had to work in the less popular hospitals and communities, and frequently in inner cities. He opted for a residency in a brand-new program in Johnson City, Tennessee, affiliated with East Tennessee State University. He was a resident there from 1980 to 1983, and then secured a coveted fellowship at Boston University School of Medicine in 1983, where he worked for two years at Boston City Hospital and where he saw the early signs of the urban epidemic of HIV in that city. Returning to Johnson City in 1985 as assistant professor of medicine (he later became a tenured associate professor there), he encountered the first signs of a second epidemic, that of rural AIDS. His work with the patients he cared for and his insights into his personal transformation from being "homoignorant", as he describes it, to having an understanding of his patients resulted a few years later in his first book, My Own Country (1994).

New direction: writing

Exhausted from the overwhelming nature of his work with his patients, with his first marriage under strain and by then having begun to write seriously, he decided to take a break. He applied to and was accepted to the Iowa Writers Workshop at the University of Iowa. He cashed in his retirement plan and his tenured position to go to Iowa City with his young family. There, he honed his writing skills and earned a Master of Fine Arts in 1991. After Iowa, he accepted a position as Professor of Medicine and Chief of the Division of Infectious Diseases at Texas Tech Health Sciences Center in El Paso, Texas, where he lived for the next 11 years. Despite his title, he was the sole infectious disease physician for a busy county hospital—Thomason Hospital—for many years. His skills and commitment to patient care resulted in his being awarded the Grover E. Murray Distinguished Professorship of Medicine at the Texas Tech School of Medicine.

During these years in El Paso, he also wrote and published his first book, the bestseller My Own Country: A Doctor's Story, about his experiences in East Tennessee, but also pondering themes of displacement, Diaspora, responses to foreignness and the many individuals and families affected by the AIDS epidemic. This book was one of five chosen as Best Book of the Year by Time magazine and it was later made into a movie by Mira Nair with Lost star Naveen Andrews playing his role.

His second book, The Tennis Partner: A Story of Friendship and Loss, also written during his time in El Paso, is another eloquently personal story, this time about his friend and tennis partner, a medical resident in recovery from drug addiction. The story deals with the ultimate death of his friend and explores the issue and prevalence of physician drug abuse. It also concludes the account of the breakdown of his first marriage, an integral part of the narrative in both My Own Country and The Tennis Partner. This book was reissued in 2009.

Verghese has three children, two grown sons by his first marriage and a third by his second marriage.

Bedside medicine
Verghese became founding Director of The Center for Medical Humanities and Ethics at the University of Texas Health Science Center at San Antonio in 2002. His focus here was on medical humanities as a way to preserve the innate empathy and sensitivity that brings students to medical school but which the rigor of their training frequently represses. In San Antonio, besides developing a formal humanities and ethics curriculum that was integrated into all four years of the medical school program, he invited medical students to accompany him on bedside rounds as a way of demonstrating his conviction about the value of the physical examination in diagnosing patients and in developing a caring, two-way patient-doctor relationship that benefits not only patients and their families but also the physician. At San Antonio, he held the Joaquin Cigarroa Chair and the Marvin Forland Distinguished Professorship.

After a relatively short, five-year tenure in San Antonio, he was recruited to Stanford University School of Medicine in late 2007 as tenured professor for the Theory and Practice of Medicine and Associate Chair of Internal Medicine. His deep interest in bedside medicine and his reputation as a clinician, teacher and writer have continued to define his role at Stanford, where he is deeply involved with patients at Stanford Hospital and directs the third-year medical student clerkship. His writing and work continue to explore the importance of bedside medicine, the ritual of the physical examination in the era of advanced technology, where, as he notes frequently in his writing, the patient in the bed is often ignored in favor of the patient data in the computer. He is renowned at Stanford for his weekly bedside rounds, where he insists on examining patients without knowledge of their diagnosis to demonstrate the wealth of information available from the physical exam. This emphasis has led to the development of "The Stanford 25", a new initiative at Stanford designed to showcase and teach 25 fundamental physical exam skills and their diagnostic benefits to interns.

Verghese's emphasis on the physical examination has been dismissed by some as a form of irrelevant nostalgia. As Robert Goodman writes: "Lamenting lost clinical skills is possibly one of our profession's oldest pastimes, dating back centuries, if not millennia...Should we spend more time at the bedside? Certainly...But... we should spend this time not divining for ascitic fluid (ultrasound is better) but, instead, talking to our patients.

Cutting for Stone
His first novel, Cutting for Stone, is set in Ethiopia and the United States and describes a period of dramatic political change in Ethiopia, a time of great loss for the author himself, who as an expatriate had to leave the country even though he had been born there. Cutting for Stone reached #1 on the Independent Booksellers list and was optioned as a movie. Verghese's writing has also appeared in The New Yorker, Texas Monthly, The Atlantic, The New York Times, The New York Times Magazine, Granta, Forbes The Daily Beast and The Wall Street Journal.

Works
My Own Country: A Doctor's Story (1994)
The Tennis Partner (1998)
Cutting for Stone (2008)

Awards and honors
Lambda Literary Award for Gay Men's Biography/Autobiography for My Own Country (1995)
Wellcome Book Prize Shortlist for Cutting for Stone (2009)
Heinz Award in the Arts and Humanities (2014)
 National Humanities Medal (2015)

See also

 Physician writer

References

External links

 Abraham Verghese Web Site
 Stanford Profile
 Emory postcolonial studies biography
 Abraham Verghese discussing bedside medicine (podcast)
 

Physicians from Tennessee
Ethiopian emigrants to the United States
Stanford University School of Medicine faculty
American male writers of Indian descent
American people of Malayali descent
East Tennessee State University alumni
Iowa Writers' Workshop alumni
Living people
1955 births
Madras Medical College alumni
Lambda Literary Award winners
American physicians of Indian descent
American male essayists
National Humanities Medal recipients
Members of the National Academy of Medicine